Mother of God often refers to:
Theotokos, in Eastern/Greek Orthodox Christianity
 Deipara, Latin for the Mother of God (Roman Catholic)
Deiparae Virginis Mariae, a 1946 encyclical of Pope Pius XII relating to the Assumption of the Blessed Virgin 

Mother of God may also refer to:


Art
The Mother of God, a painting by Fyodor Bronnikov
Mother of God of Trakai, an icon

Books
Mother of God, a novel by David Ambrose 1995
The Mother of God, a book by Luna Tarlo
Die Gottesmutter (novel), a German novel by Leopold Sacher-Masoch
Mother of God: One Man’s Journey to the Uncharted Depths of the Amazon Rainforest, by Paul Rosolie
Mother of God: A History of the Virgin Mary, by Miri Rubin
On the Mother of God, by Jacob of Serug

People
Maye Musk, mother of Elon Musk

Other uses
Mother of God Community, Washington DC

See also
God the Mother (disambiguation)